Eccentricity (also called quirkiness) is an unusual or odd behavior on the part of an individual. This behavior would typically be perceived as unusual or unnecessary, without being demonstrably maladaptive. Eccentricity is contrasted with normal behavior, the nearly universal means by which individuals in society solve given problems and pursue certain priorities in everyday life. People who consistently display benignly eccentric behavior are labeled as "eccentrics".

Etymology

From Medieval Latin eccentricus, derived from Greek , "out of the center", from -, - "out of" + , "center". Eccentric first appeared in English essays as a neologism in 1551 as an astronomical term meaning "a circle in which the earth, sun, etc. deviates from its center." Five years later, in 1556, an adjective form of the word was used. In 1685, the definition evolved from the literal to the figurative, and eccentric is noted to have begun being used to describe unconventional or odd behavior. A noun form of the word – a person who possesses and exhibits these unconventional or odd qualities and behaviors – appeared by 1832.

Depictions
Eccentricity is often associated with genius, intellectual giftedness, or creativity. People may perceive the individual's eccentric behavior as the outward expression of their unique intelligence or creative impulse. In this vein, the eccentric's habits are incomprehensible not because they are illogical or the result of madness, but because they stem from a mind so original that it cannot be conformed to societal norms. English utilitarian thinker John Stuart Mill (1806–1873) wrote that "the amount of eccentricity in a society has generally been proportional to the amount of genius, mental vigour, and moral courage which it contained", and mourned a lack of eccentricity as "the chief danger of the time". Edith Sitwell (1887–1964) wrote that eccentricity is "often a kind of innocent pride", also saying that geniuses and aristocrats are called eccentrics because "they are entirely unafraid of and uninfluenced by the opinions and vagaries of the crowd". Eccentricity is also associated with great wealth — what would be considered signs of insanity in a poor person, some may accept as eccentricity in wealthy people.

Comparison to considerations of normality

A person who is simply in a "fish out of water" situation is not, by the strictest definition, an eccentric since (presumably) they may be ordinary by the conventions of their native environment.

Eccentrics may or may not comprehend the standards for normal behavior in their culture. They are simply unconcerned by society's disapproval of their habits or beliefs.

Some eccentrics are pejoratively considered "cranks" rather than geniuses. Eccentric behavior is often considered whimsical or quirky, although it can also be strange and disturbing. Many individuals previously considered merely eccentric, such as aviation magnate Howard Hughes, have recently been retrospectively diagnosed as actually having had mental disorders (obsessive–compulsive disorder in Hughes' case).

Other people may have an eccentric taste in clothes, or eccentric hobbies or collections they pursue with great vigor. They may have a pedantic and precise manner of speaking, intermingled with inventive wordplay.  Many of these behaviors share the characteristics of someone with an autistic spectrum disorder, such as the eccentric hobbies or the pedantic speech.

Many individuals may even manifest eccentricities consciously and deliberately in an attempt to differentiate themselves from societal norms or enhance a sense of inimitable identity. Given the overwhelmingly positive stereotypes (at least in popular culture and especially with fictional characters) often associated with eccentricity, as detailed above, certain individuals seek to be associated with this sort of character type. However, this is not always successful as eccentric individuals are not necessarily charismatic and the individual in question may simply be dismissed by others as just seeking attention.

Characteristics
Psychologist David Weeks believes people with a mental illness suffer from their behavior, while eccentrics are quite happy. He even states eccentrics are less prone to mental illness than everyone else.

According to Weeks' study, there are several distinctive characteristics that often differentiate a healthy eccentric person from a regular person or someone who has a mental illness. The first five characteristics on Weeks' list are found in most people regarded as eccentric:

 Nonconforming
 Creative
 Strongly motivated by curiosity
 Happily obsessed with one or more hobbyhorses (usually five or six)
 Aware from early childhood that they are different
 Intelligent
 Opinionated and outspoken
 Noncompetitive, not in need of reassurance or reinforcement from society
 Unusual in their eating habits and living arrangements
 Not particularly interested in the opinions or company of other people
 Possessed of a mischievous sense of humor

See also
 Asperger syndrome
 Byronic hero
 Cults of personality in Turkmenistan
 Eight Eccentrics of Yangzhou
 Foolishness for Christ
 Idiosyncrasy
 Individualism
 Keep Austin Weird
 Obsessive–compulsive disorder
 Personality psychology
 Schizotypal personality disorder
 Thinking outside the box

References

 
Human behavior
Deviance (sociology)
Stereotypes